Jula Hughes is the Dean of the Bora Laskin Faculty of Law at Lakehead University. She was previously a professor at the University of New Brunswick Faculty of Law.

References

Year of birth missing (living people)
Living people
Place of birth missing (living people)
Academic staff of Lakehead University
Academic staff of the University of New Brunswick